Sinan Pasha Mosque is a mosque in Kaçanik, southern Kosovo. It was built in 1594–95.

The mosque was built by Sinan Pasha, the five-time Grand Vizier of the Ottoman Empire, along with the fort in Kaçanik.

See also
Islam in Kosovo
Cultural monuments of the Kosovo district

References

Religious buildings and structures completed in 1595
1595 establishments in the Ottoman Empire
16th-century mosques
Ottoman mosques in Kosovo
Religious buildings and structures in Kaçanik